Gilda Gross (born February 10, 1981 in Santo Domingo), commonly known as Gilda Jovine, is a Dominican beauty pageant titleholder,  actress and model.

She was born and raised in Santo Domingo to a businessman from the United States and a businesswoman from Constanza. Jovine was inspired by her grandmother, one of the first dressmakers for Oscar De La Renta. Jovine began modeling at age 15 and has participated in fashion shows in the Dominican Republic, New York City, and Puerto Rico. She has also appeared in magazines, billboards, and catalogs, and has acted in several television commercials.

In 1999, Jovine participated in and won the Miss Latina International pageant held in New York City. The next year, she became Miss Dominican Republic 2000 representing the municipality of Constanza. She represented her country in the Miss Universe 2000 pageant, held in Cyprus, and at Miss World 2000 in London. Jovine typically wears blue pageant dresses. Standing nearly 6 feet, Jovine was among the taller contestants in Miss Dominican Republic 2000.

Jovine graduated from the Barbizon School in New York City and Universidad Iberoamericana in Santo Domingo majoring in Public Relations, but what she loved most was painting. Some of her work has been displayed in New York galleries such as Salon 94 and Art Gotham.

References

1980 births
Dominican Republic female models
Dominican Republic people of European American descent
Living people
Miss Dominican Republic
Miss Universe 2000 contestants
Miss World 2000 delegates
People from Santo Domingo
White Dominicans